Medric Charles Francis Boucher (March 12, 1886 – March 12, 1974) was a Major League Baseball player in 1914. He played for the Baltimore Terrapins and Pittsburgh Rebels of the Federal League.

Boucher also played soccer in St. Louis during the winter break.  In 1910, he was a right full back with St. Leo's of the St. Louis Soccer League.

External links

1886 births
1974 deaths
Major League Baseball catchers
Baltimore Terrapins players
Pittsburgh Rebels players
Rock Island Islanders players
Decatur Commodores players
Danville Speakers players
Dubuque Dubs players
Dubuque Hustlers players
Baseball players from Missouri
Soccer players from St. Louis
American soccer players
St. Louis Soccer League players
St. Leo’s players

Association footballers not categorized by position